Arz is a British rapper and songwriter from east London. His single, "Alone With You", reached number 25 in the UK Singles Chart. It was certified gold in the UK by BPI.

Discography

Singles

References

English male rappers
Living people
Rappers from London
Year of birth missing (living people)